Justin Alejandro Fargas (born January 25, 1980) is a former American football running back. He played college football at Michigan and Southern California and was drafted by the Oakland Raiders in the third round of the 2003 NFL Draft.

College career
Fargas attended the University of Michigan, as a highly regarded football prospect, for three years (1998–2000). He was named one of the Top 10 Freshmen in the country by Sports Illustrated. During his freshman year, he ran for 277 yards with 1 TD on 77 carries (3.6 avg.) in 10 games. He started there as a running back before switching to safety in the middle of the 2000 season. Yet his college career at Michigan was cut short during his freshman season when he broke his leg. He was redshirted in 1999 while he rehabilitated his broken right leg.

After looking at both California and USC, Fargas chose to transfer to USC in 2001.  Due to NCAA transfer rules he sat out the 2001 season. In 2002, his final season in college, Fargas rushed for 715 yards on 161 carries (4.4 yards per rush) with the Trojans.

Track and field
Fargas was also a track star at the University of Michigan.  He recorded personal best of 10.37 seconds in the 100 meters while in high school at Notre Dame High School in Sherman Oaks, California while qualifying for the 1998 CIF California State Meet and 50.13 seconds in the 400 meters in 2007 during the off season while playing for the Oakland Raiders.  Fargas won the state championship in 1997.

Personal bests

Professional career

2003 NFL Combine

Oakland Raiders

Fargas played for seven seasons for the Oakland Raiders after being drafted in the third round of the 2003 NFL Draft. Fargas did not have many rushing attempts in his first several years. In 2006 he started six games and rushed 178 times for 659 yards and one touchdown. In 2007 he took over after LaMont Jordan became injured and had a 1,000-yard season, rushing for 1,009 yards on 222 carries and four touchdowns. He was the starting running back for the Raiders for most of the 2008 season and had 218 carries for 853 yards and one touchdown. He split time in 2009 with Darren McFadden and Michael Bush, and he was second on the team in rushing with 129 carries for 491 yards and three touchdowns. On March 6, 2010, he was released by the Raiders after reportedly failing his physical. Fargas disputed the claim.

Denver Broncos
Fargas signed with the Denver Broncos on August 11, 2010. They needed a running back after Knowshon Moreno, Correll Buckhalter, and LenDale White were all injured in training camp. It was his first action with a team since undergoing arthroscopic knee surgery in March. He was released by the Broncos on August 30, 2010.

NFL statistics 
Rushing Stats

Personal life
Fargas is the son of Starsky and Hutch actor Antonio Fargas and designer Taylor Hastie.

He was indirectly referenced in an early episode of The Simpsons, when a show titled "Old Starsky and Hutches" wins an Ace Award at a ceremony hosted by Homer as a Krusty the Klown impersonator. The award is accepted by "the son of the guy who played Huggy Bear".

Fargas is married to basketball coach and executive Nikki Caldwell. Their first child was born in March 2012.

References

External links
 Oakland Raiders bio
 CNN/SI player page
 CBS Sportsline
 USC Trojans football bio

1980 births
Living people
People from Encino, Los Angeles
Players of American football from Los Angeles
American football running backs
American sportspeople of Puerto Rican descent
American sportspeople of Trinidad and Tobago descent
Michigan Wolverines football players
USC Trojans football players
Oakland Raiders players
Denver Broncos players
Track and field athletes from Los Angeles
Ed Block Courage Award recipients